Soaring Highs and Brutal Lows: The Voices of Women in Metal  (also known as Soaring Highs and Brutal Lows) is a 2015 Canadian documentary film, directed by Mark Harwood, that follows the personal journeys of women from different generations who are prominent vocalists inside the heavy metal music genre. It premiered theatrically in Eindhoven, Netherlands on October 15, 2015  and is distributed by the National Film Board of Canada.

Background
According to director Mark Harwood, the idea for making the film came from the absence of documentaries regarding the journey of women inside the heavy metal music genre, as there were a great number of documentaries regarding other aspects of this extreme type of music. From this point, the director wanted to depict the musical and personal trajectory of these women and what drove them on creating their art. Although some structural changes had to be done and new topics for discussion and exploring surfaced, the director managed to follow most parts of his original ideas. The movie combines interviews and parts of live performances in an effort to present the work of the artists in balance with their stories. Harwood attempted this balance in order for the film to appeal to the wider public and not be exclusive to metal enthusiasts. Archival footage was another device adopted on the film.

Cast
 Floor Jansen
 Simone Simons
 Charlotte Wessels
 Anneke van Giersbergen
 Marcela Bovio
 Alissa White-Gluz
 Kobra Paige
 Doro Pesch

References

External links
 

2015 documentary films
Documentary films about singers
Documentary films about women in music
Documentary films about heavy metal music and musicians

Dutch documentary films
American documentary films
German documentary films
Canadian documentary films
Belgian documentary films
2010s English-language films
2010s Canadian films
2010s American films
2010s German films
English-language Dutch films
English-language German films
English-language Canadian films
English-language Belgian films